Wallball, (less commonly known as tan), is a team sport played between a various number of players per team in which players hit a bouncy ball against a wall, using their hands. The game requires the ball to be hit to the floor before hitting the wall, but in other respects is similar to squash. One player on one team may bounce the ball against the wall so a player only on the opposing team cannot bounce it back to the wall. The last person to be holding the ball after everyone is out is the winner, and their team immediately wins the game. The game requires lots of motion, and especially benefits young athletes when playing mostly at schools.

Wallball is derived from many New York City street games played by young people, often involving the Spalding hi-bounce balls popular in the 1950s. The game is similar to Gaelic Handball, butts up, aces-kings-queens, Chinese handball, Pêl-Law (Welsh handball), and American handball.

Objective

The objective of wallball is to eliminate all other players in order to be the last player standing, or to be the starter of the game continuously (if the game is endless). There game consists of at-least two players, goes for less than 10 minutes and only requires a bouncy ball.

The aim of the game is to hit the ball against a wall. If the person hits the wall and the ball bounces out of play the person next in line loses a life. People first decide who serves. This procedure varies, but is usually the winner of the previous game or the person who got the ball (if that would be the first game), or the new person coming in. The server first hits the ball forward and down so that it hits the ground and bounces up to hit the wall. (If the server is a good sport, an easy ball is started with to get the game going.) If it bounces on the ground more than once or if it doesn't bounce on the ground before it hits the wall, it is considered out. Then, after hitting the wall, the ball would bounce back, and the next person would do the same thing. If the ball bounces more than once before the second player hits it the second person is out, but hitting the ball before it bounces is allowed after the first person hits the ball. If the ball bounces out of bounds (the boundaries are usually determined by the orange lines surrounding the field) at any time, it is considered out, and if it hits the orange line, it is sometimes considered in, sometimes considered out, and sometimes considered a "liney" or "liner" in which the game stops and the person who made the liney serves again. The goal is to get the person behind you out by hitting it with the right force and in the right direction. There are sometimes rules called "first serves", in which the server doesn't get out until the third time the server gets out.

There are many variations to the rules, but the rules above are the classic ones. Babies, in which the ball on the second bounce is smaller than the closest interior orange line to the wall (there are two orange lines; one is about three-four feet from the wall, and the other one is about two-thirds of the court away from the wall) and sliceys (or skimmers), where the ball goes at an extremely high speed and extremely low height, are very common varying things (in or out).

There are four main types of wallball: regular, teams, line-up, and random.

 Regular is where the players line up outside of the court on a bench (which is usually present) or standing if there is no bench, and two players enter the court. They play, and the losing player goes to the end of the line, and the next person comes up.
 Teams is the same as regular, except that there are four (or more, but even) players that come up (grouped in equal teams).
 Line-up is where all the players line up in a line that is either determined by the winning person or in "random order", where the players pick the order, and they play in order (the server goes after the last person).
 Random is where all the players are scattered around the court, the server serves, and a random person (whoever wants to hit the ball) comes up and hits the ball. In random, when nobody hits the ball, players determine who is out by either considering it a re-do (the server or another person serves again), "flinching" (the person who reacts to the ball in a fashion that looks like the player is going to hit the ball), nearest person (the closest person to the ball is out), or a combination of nearest person and flinching (if somebody flinches, the flinching person is out; if nobody flinches, the nearest person is out).

In line-up or random, the winner of each game usually decides the rules and game style of the next game (usually with the classic rules, but the winner usually has the right to change them, though if enough people disagree, the idea is usually not used), and in regular or teams, the first person to beat the whole line gets to determine the rules and game style of the next game. If playing with a soccer ball/football, they have to hit it wherever it lies, if against

Alternative rules
Players stand a few feet away from the wall. They may only get three outs (no outs if you want the game to be endless). If a player receives three outs they may be "pegged", where another player throws the ball at them intending to hit them. A player serves the ball by throwing directly at the wall. The ball then should return to another player. It is not an out if you get the ball again but is considered unfair if you intended to get the ball back (however, if the ball returns to you three times, it is formally known as a "tea party", and you are out). If the ball bounces first, it is an out. If you drop the ball or the ball hits you, you will have to get to the wall before someone else throws the ball and hits the wall or you will get an out. If you get the ball that is out-of-bounds, players are permitted to shout "challenge!" During challenges, you have to throw the ball from the same place where you picked up the ball. You may only take tiny steps then throw or move backwards. If you move anywhere else, you will get an out. If a player catches the ball with one hand they may yell "South Philly" and try to tag as many other players out before they reach safety at the wall. These alternative rules are more common in the Midwest and Canada. 

In Australia however the rules are slightly different where there are rules for spiking. Spiking is when the ball hits another player on the full without bouncing and the player which is hit goes on the wall. 

Some versions are played using two walls adjacent to each other, called "cube ball" where the same rules apply except two walls are used instead of one. Another, called "Aceball", is similar to wallball except that the ball is hit on the wall without a bounce, then allowed to bounce once before a returning hit is required from the other player. Aceball can be played by kicking it as well, though it is no where near as prominent.

Wallball language

 Pop: When the ball hits the ground and the wall at the same time.
 Airplane: When the ball hits the wall without having bounced first.
 Angle: Someone hits the ball in such a way that leads the ball out of the playing area. This is especially applied in an outdoor location.
 Artificial Blackjack: A player may hit the ball at another person in one smooth motion. If the person getting hit at catches it or it hits them, they are out. If the thrower misses, then they are out. People may also do a pop-up before hitting the ball at another person.
 Baby: A small, hard to get shot (ball must clear two feet from the bottom of the wall).
 Fault: An incorrect serve which leads to the re-serving of the ball.
 Blackjack: Similar to an artificial Blackjack, except everyone freezes and the person who caught the ball tries to throw it at someone. (After the ball leaves their hands, players may move freely. They can also call a number of steps in the order for the thrower or catcher, eg. "I call 5 steps for catcher and 3 steps for thrower.")
 Banana Split (slicey) aka Buttercup: A player swipes their hand under the ball, without touching the ball, and says "Banana Split!"(optinal) or nothing The opponent now has to hit the ball.
 Beartrap: When the thrower yells 'Beartrap', you can't grab the ball after it hits the wall or you sit out for a round.
 Black Magic (Fakie): Placing one's hands in front of the ball and maybe pretending to hit it,  once (faking the other person out or to get a reaction out of them) but not hitting it, when it is the opponent's turn
 Bus stop: When the ball is returned to a player, the player yells "Bus stop!" and they bounce the ball once and then hit it.
 Buttcrack AKA Pop AKA Ace: When the ball hits the ground and the wall at the same time.
 Challenge (changes how someone hits it 1 turn only): When a player without the ball shouts challenge, the player with the ball must throw the ball to the wall from where he/she is standing.
 Control: When a player pushes the ball with their hands toward the wall, controlling it.
 Cross (country): Similar to an angle, a cross is a shot played across the wall to make the opposition run for the ball (sometimes called cross country).
 Double Bounce: Ball bounces more than once before hitting the wall, leading to elimination.
 waterfall: Hitting the ball with an angle that makes the ball skim the wall (sometimes called waterfall). (Though "Waterfall" may also refer to a ball that hits so high/straight/parallel to the wall that it skims the wall twice before coming down.)
Powerhouse/Hardy: Also known as a slam, a big hit.
 Holdy: Sometimes simply referred to as a "hold", when someone holds on to the ball rather than slapping/hitting it.
 Skimmey aka Skimmer: a low, fast-moving ball, a hyper, or super, skimmer goes exceedingly fast and low, and can only be performed by talented players (may be known as something else, like "Slicey", or "Snake") Sometimes, "Grounder", or "Roller" may be called to force a redo. 
 Interference: When the ball hits an outside object or hits a player directly after being hit by another player (before hitting the wall). Usually, the judge (the first person in the waiting line) serves on an interference, and calls which player to hit it. Sometimes, if the judge is hit, the judge can get you out. This term may be shortened simply as an inter.
 Ogden: When the ball hits the palm of the hand and does not have enough power to reach the wall.
 Out: When the ball goes out of the intended, predetermined playing surface.
 toilet: Jumping over the ball instead of hitting it mostly on serves.
 Pop: "Pop" or "Poppy" (as in "no pops"): shot where the ball hits the wall where it meets the ground, and sort of "pops" out of the corner, usually loudly if using a large red rubber ball (i.e. 4 Square ball)—depends on rules agreed before the game but usually not illegal (similar to babies) and thus results in the committing a redo.
 Pop-up: Once the ball bounces once, hitting/popping it up again and then hitting it to the wall. 
 Rainbow: Player can do a "Rainbow by going under the ball, before its first bounce, after going off the wall without touching the ball successfully, and another player has to hit the ball (sometimes called underdogs or watermelons).
 Review: In some games, players can challenge, or ask for a review that they are not out for whatever reason. If they lose the challenge, they cannot challenge anymore.
 airplane: A hard hit that directly hits the wall, rather than bouncing once; typically followed by the elimination of the player who shot that ball (may be known as something else, such as bullet, jet, and direct).
 Skimmey on water: The ball returns in a faster pace due to wet contact or the ball's particular rotation.
 Slicey: A player swipes their hand under the ball, without touching the ball, and says "Slicey!" The opponent now has to hit the ball.
 Time Out: Also known as TO, Stopping the game right in the middle of it (player must call "Time in" (Ti) to play again).
 Top Hat: Player hits the ball on top and says "Top Hat!", making the ball bounce straight down. The other player must hit the ball before it bounces twice and the ball must hit the ground before it hits the wall.
 Trap bounce: Where the ball traps after bouncing once. It typically leads to an elimination or judging.
 Troll time: In the alternate rules when an opposing player throws the ball to the wall a long way away, a player deflects the ball down to the ground touches the wall, then re-throws the ball to the wall all before the opponent has the opportunity to get back to the wall.
 Type Writer: Hitting the ball at the wall, then continually hitting the ball without it touching the floor until the hitter sees fit to let the ball rotate to the next player by hitting the ball against the wall one last time with force. Type Writer should not exceed 5 seconds.
 Airplane: A hard hit that directly hits the wall, rather than bouncing once; typically followed by the elimination of the player who shot that ball (may be known as something else, such as bullet, jet, and direct).

See also 
 Four Square
 Handball (school) (Australian schoolyard variant of Four-square)
 Irish Handball
 Fives

References

Children's games
Games of physical skill
Physical education
Street games
Wall and ball games